David Miller (born 18 September 1943) is a Canadian sailor.  He won a bronze medal in the Soling Class at the 1972 Summer Olympics.

References
 Profile at sports-reference.com

1943 births
Living people
Sportspeople from Vancouver
Canadian male sailors (sport)
Olympic sailors of Canada
Sailors at the 1964 Summer Olympics – Star
Sailors at the 1968 Summer Olympics – Dragon
Sailors at the 1972 Summer Olympics – Soling
Olympic bronze medalists for Canada
Olympic medalists in sailing
Medalists at the 1972 Summer Olympics